Douglas Township is one of twenty-six townships in Iroquois County, Illinois, USA.  As of the 2010 census, its population was 2,104 and it contained 923 housing units.  Douglas Township was formed from a portion of Onarga Township in May 1858.

Geography

Cities, towns, villages
 Gilman

Unincorporated towns
 La Hogue at 
 Leonard at 
(This list is based on USGS data and may include former settlements.)

Cemeteries
The township contains Wenger Cemetery and St. Mary's Cemetery.

Major highways
  Interstate 57
  U.S. Route 24
  U.S. Route 45

Airports and landing strips
 Kuiper Landing Strip

Demographics

School districts
 Crescent Iroquois Community Unit School District 249
 Iroquois West Community Unit School District 10
 Tri Point Community Unit School District 6-J

Political districts
 Illinois' 15th congressional district
 State House District 105
 State Senate District 53

References
 
 United States Census Bureau 2007 TIGER/Line Shapefiles
 United States National Atlas

External links
 City-Data.com
 Illinois State Archives

Townships in Iroquois County, Illinois
Townships in Illinois